Agrology (from Greek , agros, "field, tilled land"; and , -logia) is the branch of soil science dealing with the production of crops. The use of the term is most active in Canada. Use of the term outside Canada is sporadic but significant. The term appears especially well established in Russia and China, with agrologists on university faculty lists and agrology curricula.

Agrology is synonymous with agricultural science when used in Canada, is nearly synonymous with the U.S. term agronomy, and has a meaning related to agricultural soil science when used outside Canada.

Canada
The term agrologist was coined by Dr. J. B. Harrington and adopted in 1946 to fill the need in Canada to have a term to denote "provincial agriculturalist". The title of Professional Agrologist is conferred on persons with at least a bachelor's degree in agriculture and who can demonstrate the qualities needed to responsibly teach, practise, or conduct experiments and research in the agricultural sciences. According to the Agricultural Institute of Canada website, an agrologist can also hold a degree in a field related to agriculture, or in some provinces pass rigorous prescribed examinations to attain a professional designation.

Agrology is a regulated profession in all Canadian provinces. Agrology designations are managed by separate governing bodies in each province, with each operating under its own legislation. Agrology refers to agricultural science and agricultural economics when used in Canada; however, the definition is not limited application of science to agriculture. Because of the extensive history of agricultural research into land and water resources, the definition in Canada includes applications science to management and conservation of land and water resources, and habitat. The Registrars of Professional Agrologists across Canada adopted the following definition of Agrology in May 2007: "Agrology is the practice of bioresource sciences to provide knowledge and advice to support the development of the agriculture sector and the health of the society, environment, and economy."

Outside Canada
Outside of Canada, the term agrology is synonymous with soil science and is not in common usage in English-speaking countries.

Agrology in soil science society glossaries
Two national member societies (Canadian, American) of the International Union of Soil Sciences (IUSS) maintain and publish glossaries of scientific terms. Other soil science societies defer to the American glossary. The term agrology is not in use. Edaphology or crop edaphology in combination with soil management would be the preferred approach used by soil scientists to concisely describe soil science as it applies to crop production.

Agrology dictionary definitions
, no dictionary definition of agrology is yet consistent with the Canadian use of the term and dictionary definitions fall into one of four categories.
 agrology is defined as synonymous with soil science. The root agr- is represented as meaning soil.
 agrology is defined as synonymous with soil science, but the context implies that soil science is a subdiscipline of agricultural science.
 agrology is defined as the subdiscipline of soil science as it applies to crop production. This would make agrology synonymous with the term crop edaphology.
 agrology is defined as the subdiscipline of agronomy that considers the influence of soil.

See also
List of soil topics

References

Soil science glossaries
 Soil Science Society of America 
 Canadian Soil Science Society
 Canadian Soil Science Society (mirror)

Dictionaries
 Websters Online Dictionary – The Rosetta Edition
 Dictionary.com
 The American Heritage Dictionary of the English Language
 The Free Internet Lexicon and Encyclopedia*

Agrology faculty and curricula - non-Canadian
 Altay State Agrarian University Russia
 Huazhong Agricultural University China
 Northeast Institute of Geography and Agricultural Ecology China

Other
 British Columbia Institute of Agrologists
 Glossary definition: agrology

Agronomy
Agricultural soil science

zh:土壤学